Cydnocoris is a genus of assassin bugs found in tropical Asia. It has been suggested that this genus be either treated as a synonym of Cutocoris  or the later name be suppressed.

Cydnocoris gilvus has been considered a potential biological control agent against Helopeltis as it is mass-culturable with low cannibalism. A post-mortem on a patient found that death had been caused by choking from inflamed throat caused by a Cydnocoris gilvus that had been accidentally ingested.

Species in the genus include:
 Cydnocoris fasciatus 
 Cydnocoris gilvus 
 Cydnocoris crocatus 
 Cydnocoris russatus

References 

Reduviidae
Hemiptera genera